Río Cañas Abajo is a barrio in the municipality of Juana Díaz, Puerto Rico. Its population in 2010 was 2,848.

History
Puerto Rico was ceded by Spain in the aftermath of the Spanish–American War under the terms of the Treaty of Paris of 1898 and became an unincorporated territory of the United States. In 1899, the United States Department of War conducted a census of Puerto Rico finding that the population of Río Cañas Abajo barrio was 1,066.

Hurricane Maria
Like the rest of the island, residents of Río Cañas Abajo faced hardship after Hurricane Maria struck Puerto Rico on September 20, 2017, when they were left with destroyed infrastructure and no electrical power for months.

See also

 List of communities in Puerto Rico

References

External links
 

Barrios of Juana Díaz, Puerto Rico